Hitch Hike Lady is a 1935 American comedy film directed by Aubrey Scotto and written by Gordon Rigby and Lester Cole. The film stars Alison Skipworth, Mae Clarke, Arthur Treacher, James Ellison, Warren Hymer and Beryl Mercer. The film was released on December 28, 1935, by Republic Pictures.

Plot

Cast
Alison Skipworth as Mrs. Amelia Blake
Mae Clarke as Judith Martin
Arthur Treacher as Mortimer Wingate
James Ellison as Jimmy Peyton 
Warren Hymer as Cluck Regan
Beryl Mercer as Mrs. Bayne
J. Farrell MacDonald as Judge Hale
Christian Rub as Farmer
Harold Waldridge as Oswald Brown
Irving Bacon as Ed Simpson
Lionel Belmore as Mr. Harker 
George "Gabby" Hayes as Miner 
Dell Henderson as Williams
Clay Clement as Warden
Ward Bond as Motorcycle Officer
Otis Harlan as Mayor Loomis
Charles C. Wilson as Mike

References

External links
 

1935 films
American comedy films
1935 comedy films
Republic Pictures films
Films directed by Aubrey Scotto
American black-and-white films
Films produced by Nat Levine
1930s English-language films
1930s American films